Walter Risley was an American football, basketball and baseball coach. He was the head football coach at Kutztown University of Pennsylvania for one season in 1946.

Risley served for head baseball coach from 1945 to 1971 and the head men's basketball coach from 1945 to 1963.

Head coaching record

Football

References

External links
 Kutztown Hall of Fame profile

Year of birth missing
1971 deaths
Kutztown Golden Bears athletic directors
Kutztown Golden Bears baseball coaches
Kutztown Golden Bears men's basketball coaches
Kutztown Golden Bears football coaches